Gasthof Taferne is an inn in Mandling village, which is part of Schladming, Austria. It is near the Schladming Tauern hiking area and the Ski Amadé winter sports area.

References

Hotels in Austria
Economy of Styria